"The Heat Is On" is a song written by Florrie Palmer and Tony Ashton, originally recorded by Australian singer Noosha Fox in 1979. It was notably recorded by Swedish singer Agnetha Fältskog in 1983 for her debut English-language solo studio album, Wrap Your Arms Around Me.

Original releases
The song was originally recorded in 1979 by Noosha Fox, which failed to chart when Fox released it as a single. It had also been rewritten by Manfred Mann's Earth Band as "On the Run" for their 1980 album Chance.

Agnetha Fältskog version
Fältskog's version was released as lead European single from Wrap Your Arms Around Me and reached No.1 in Sweden and Norway, and peaked at No. 2 in Belgium and the Netherlands. In the United Kingdom, "The Heat Is On" peaked at No. 35, making it Fältskog's highest-charting solo single in the UK until the release of her 2004 comeback single, "If I Thought You'd Ever Change Your Mind", which reached No. 11.

The B-side of "The Heat Is On" was the song "Man", written by Fältskog herself. Compared to her pre-ABBA-albums where most of the songs were self-penned, this was the only song on the Wrap Your Arms Around Me album that she wrote herself.

In some countries, the record companies also released a 12-inch single featuring an extended version of "The Heat Is On" instead of the album version.

Music video
The accompanying music video was shot by Swedish director Erik Irion Nanne in a public bath in Stockholm named Centralbadet for two nights after closing time. According to Nanne, after the last shot, Fältskog fell into the water and could not continue (her hair got all wet). The video also features dancer Blossom Tainton.

Charts

References

1979 songs
1983 singles
Agnetha Fältskog songs
Number-one singles in Norway
Number-one singles in Sweden
Polar Music singles
Song recordings produced by Mike Chapman